HMNZS Manawanui (A09) was commissioned in 1988 as a diving support vessel for the Royal New Zealand Navy. Originally she was built as a diving support vessel, the Star Perseus, for North Sea oil rig operations.

Manawanui is the third ship with this name to serve in the New Zealand Navy. Manawanui is a Māori word meaning "to be brave or steadfast".

Manawanui has a capability to hold station over a fixed position. She has a triple lock recompression chamber, a crane with 13 tonne lifting capacity, wet diving bell and a small engineering workshop. She also has limited deck cargo carrying capacity.

The divers of the New Zealand Navy who work onboard Manawanui are trained for deep diving with mixed gases, underwater demolition and unexploded ordnance disposal.

An ROV operated from the Manawanui returned photos of the wreck of the MV Princess Ashika, which sank near Ha'apai, Tonga on 5 August 2009.

The vessel was decommissioned at Devonport Naval Base on February 23, 2018.

In July 2018 the ship was sold to the Major Projects Group, an Australian demotions company, and has been renamed as the MV Ocean Recovery. The ship will be used by the Major Projects Foundation (which was founded by the company) as a research and education vessel, with a focus on investigating and preventing oil spills from sunken ships in the Pacific.

The new owners, Paul and Wilma Adams, plan to base the ship at Carrington, part of the Port of Newcastle, New South Wales, Australia. They plan for the ship to be the diving base for work in Chuuk Lagoon (Truk) and more generally in the Federated States of Micronesia, where the US Navy conducted Operation Hailstone in 1944 and sank numerous warships of the Imperial Japanese Navy along with merchant ships. They plan for cathodic protection to be applied to the wrecks, to reduce the chance of further discharge of bunker oil into the lagoons.

See also
 Diving tenders of the Royal New Zealand Navy

References

External links

 Major Projects Foundation - ship info
 Royal New Zealand Navy - HMNZS MANAWANUI - A09
 Diving support 

Auxiliary ships of the Royal New Zealand Navy
1988 ships